Hypocassida subferruginea is a species of leaf beetles belonging to the family Chrysomelidae.

Description
The basic colour of the body is yellowish or reddish-brown, with light metallic reflection and blackish basal margin of the pronotum.

Ecology
Main larval host plants are in the family Convolvulaceae, especially field bindweed (Convolvulus arvensis) and larger bindweed (Calystegia sepium), but these polyphagous larvae feed also on common yarrow (Achillea millefolium). Adults occur from April to September.

Distribution and habitat
This species is present in most of European countries, in the eastern Palearctic realm, in the Near East, and in North Africa. It mainly occurs in field margins and wetlands.

References

External links 
 
 

Beetles described in 1776
Cassidinae
Beetles of Europe
Taxa named by Franz von Paula Schrank